Grant James Fox  (born 16 June 1962) is a former rugby union player from New Zealand. He was a member of the All Blacks team that won the inaugural Rugby World Cup in 1987. He is also the father of professional golfer, Ryan Fox.

Playing career

Fox was born in New Plymouth. He attended Auckland Grammar school.

During his time with the All Blacks from 1985 to 1993, he wore the number 10 jersey (first five-eighth or fly-half), and was the main goalkicker for the All Blacks. He amassed 645 points from 46 All Black Test Matches (1 try, 118 conversions, 128 penalties, 7 drop goals). He is considered a true pioneer of the modern art of goal kicking, in particular the technicalities of leaning the ball forward, which has been adopted by world class kickers since. Many believe he is one of the greatest first five-eighths in All Black history, even though he was not a great runner with the ball in hand.

Despite his relatively short height, he made up for this with fantastic distribution skills reinforced by his long-term colleague John Kirwan's then-world-record career statistics playing outside him for Auckland and the All Blacks. His inability to score tries was often a joking point in the team – his cause not helped by an overruled attempt against Ireland in 1989 (due to a prior technical infringement by a teammate).

Fox was a member of the New Zealand Cavaliers which toured apartheid South Africa in 1986, following the cancellation of the official NZRFU tour in 1985.  For participating in the rebel tour Fox was banned from selection in the All Blacks for three tests.

The highlight of Fox's career was winning the inaugural Rugby World Cup with New Zealand in 1987, a victory based in part on his accurate kicking.

Coaching and broadcasting
In the 1995 New Year Honours, Fox was appointed a Member of the Order of the British Empire, for services to rugby.

Fox remained an integral part of his Auckland club, involved at a coaching level and sharing in their success in the 1999 and 2002–2003 NPC seasons.

Fox is now a commentator on Sky Sports, NBC Sports and in the EA Sports rugby union series.

Fox provided commentary on the Rugby World Cup on ABC in 1995, with Al Michaels in 1999 and 2003 and Mike Tirico in 2007.

Fox is currently a selector with the New Zealand All Blacks (2011–present)

References

External links

Grant Fox | Rugby Database Profile

1962 births
New Zealand international rugby union players
World Rugby Hall of Fame inductees
Living people
New Zealand rugby union players
Auckland rugby union players
New Zealand rugby union coaches
Rugby union fly-halves
Rugby union players from New Plymouth
People educated at Auckland Grammar School
New Zealand Members of the Order of the British Empire
Rugby union and apartheid